Ottawa Titans can refer to:

Ottawa Titans, a professional baseball team in Ottawa, Ontario, Canada.
Ottawa Titans (lacrosse), a former box lacrosse team in Ottawa, Ontario, Canada.